Industrial Revelations is a Documentary show showing the connections between related industrial advances. The show's presenter has changed several times since the original host of Mark Williams in 2001 and 2002.

Episode guide

Series 1 - 2002 - Industrial Revelations - Mark Williams
 1. Boom Time: Coal, canals and steam, an explosive combination.
 2. Pants for All: The industrial transformation on the cotton industry.
 3. Clocking On
 4. Pennine Passage
 5. Working Iron
 6. Coining It: A look into a few of the Thousand Trades of Birmingham
 7. Cutting Edge: Steel and cutlery in Sheffield
 8. The Iron Horse
 9. Highland Flop
 10. Power Crazy

Series 2 - 2005 - More Industrial Revelations - Mark Williams
 1.  Bread and Beer
 2.  What to Wear?
 3.  Gas on Wheels
 4.  Print and Paper
 5.  Under Pressure
 6.  Building a Revolution
 7.  Bright Sparks
 8.  Heavy Metal
 9.  Cutting it fine
 10. Machine Tools

Series 3 - 2005 - Industrial Revelations - The European Story - Ronald Top
 1.  Reaping the Whirlwind
 2.  The Canal King
 3.  Hot Metal
 4.  The Impossible Railway
 5.  Big Bang
 6.  Generation Electric
 7.  Industrial Espionage
 8.  Steam on the Water
 9.  Iron Men of Sweden
 10. King Silk

Series 4 - 2006 - More Industrial Revelations Europe - Ronald Top
 1.  Bread, Beer and Salt
 2.  Building Europe
 3.  The City
 4.  Cotton, Linen and Rope
 5.  Eiffel's Tower
 6.  Exploding Engines
 7.  High Fliers
 8.  Perfect Porcelain
 9.  Steaming up the Alps
 10. Swedish Waterways

Series 5 - 2008 - Rory McGrath
 1.  Buildings
 2.  Planes
 3.  Bridges
 4.  Vehicles
 5.  Ships
 6.  Transport Networks

References

2002 British television series debuts
2008 British television series endings
British documentary television series
Discovery Channel original programming
Documentary television series about technology
English-language television shows
Industrial archaeology
Industrial history of the United Kingdom
Television series about the history of the United Kingdom
Works about the history of industries